Manya Krobo District is a former district that was located in Eastern Region, Ghana. Originally created as an ordinary district assembly in 1988, which was created from the former Kaoga District Council. However on 29 February 2008, it was split off into two new districts: Lower Manya Krobo District (which it was elevated to municipal district assembly status on 6 February 2012; capital: Odumase) and Upper Manya Krobo District (capital: Asesewa). The district assembly was located in the eastern part of Eastern Region and had Odumase as its capital town.

Sources
 
 Districts: Manya Krobo District

2008 disestablishments in Africa

Eastern Region (Ghana)

Former districts of Ghana

States and territories disestablished in 2008